The 2016 Betway Premier League Darts was a darts tournament organised by the Professional Darts Corporation – the twelfth edition of the tournament.

The event began on 4 February at the First Direct Arena in Leeds and ended with the Play-offs at The O2 Arena in London on 19 May. The tournament saw its first visit to the Netherlands after agreeing to go to the Ahoy Arena in Rotterdam on 12 May, joining 15 other venues across the UK and Ireland. This is the third year that the tournament was sponsored by Betway.

Gary Anderson was the defending champion, but he lost to Phil Taylor 10–7 in the semi-finals. Michael van Gerwen won his second Premier League Darts title by beating Taylor 11–3 in the final.

Van Gerwen also recorded the highest televised 3-dart average of 123.40 against Michael Smith during night 4 in Aberdeen.

Format
The tournament format remained identical to that since 2013. During the first nine weeks (Phase 1) each player plays the other nine players once. The bottom two players are eliminated from the competition. In the next six weeks (phase 2), each player plays the other seven players once. Phase 2 consists of four weeks where five matches are played followed by two weeks where four matches are played. At the end of phase 2 the top four players contest the two semi-finals and the final in the play-off week.

Venues
Rotterdam's Ahoy Arena became the first arena from outside the British Isles to host a Premier League event, it replaced the Brighton Centre.

Players
The players in this year's tournament were announced following the 2016 PDC World Darts Championship final on 3 January 2016, with the top four of the PDC Order of Merit joined by six Wildcards. The ten players made up the top ten in the PDC Order of Merit following the World Championship. Stephen Bunting (world number 16) and Kim Huybrechts (world number 14) did not return from last year. Robert Thornton returned after a year out, and Michael Smith made his début.

Prize money
The 2016 Premier League saw the introduction of a £25,000 League Leader's Bonus for the player who topped the league table following the 15 league nights, taking the total prize fund for the event up to £725,000 from £700,000 in 2015.

Results

League stage

4 February – Week 1 (Phase 1)
 First Direct Arena, Leeds

*Gary Anderson was originally scheduled to play against Adrian Lewis, but was sidelined with an illness, so Michael Smith played twice in Round 1. Anderson played Lewis on 17 March (Round 7), giving Smith the night off.

11 February – Week 2 (Phase 1)
 Metro Radio Arena, Newcastle upon Tyne

*Robert Thornton was originally scheduled to play against Michael Smith, but was sidelined with an illness, so James Wade played twice in Round 2. Thornton played Smith on 24 March (Round 8), giving Wade the night off.

18 February – Week 3 (Phase 1)
 3Arena, Dublin

25 February – Week 4 (Phase 1)
 GE Oil & Gas Arena, Aberdeen

3 March – Week 5 (Phase 1)
 Westpoint Arena, Exeter

10 March – Week 6 (Phase 1)
 Motorpoint Arena Nottingham, Nottingham

17 March – Week 7 (Phase 1)
 SSE Hydro, Glasgow

24 March – Week 8 (Phase 1)
 Echo Arena Liverpool, Liverpool

31 March – Week 9 (Phase 1)
 Motorpoint Arena Cardiff, Cardiff

7 April – Week 10 (Phase 2)
 Motorpoint Arena, Sheffield

14 April – Week 11 (Phase 2)
 SSE Arena Belfast, Belfast

21 April – Week 12 (Phase 2)
 Bournemouth International Centre, Bournemouth

28 April – Week 13 (Phase 2)
 Barclaycard Arena, Birmingham

5 May – Week 14 (Phase 2)
 Manchester Arena, Manchester

12 May – Week 15 (Phase 2)
 Rotterdam Ahoy, Rotterdam

Play-offs – 19 May
 The O2 Arena, London

League summary

Table
After the first nine weeks (phase 1), the bottom two in the table are eliminated. Each remaining player plays a further seven matches (phase 2). The top four players then compete in the playoffs.

When players are tied on points, leg difference is used first as a tie-breaker, after that legs won against throw and then tournament average.

{| class="wikitable sortable" style="text-align:center;"
|-
! style="width:10px;" abbr="Position"|#
! width=200 |Name
! style="width:20px;" abbr="Played"|Pld
! style="width:20px;" abbr="Won"|W
! style="width:20px;" abbr="Drawn"|D
! style="width:20px;" abbr="Lost"|L
! style="width:20px;" abbr="Points|Pts
! style="width:20px;" abbr="Legs For"|LF
! style="width:20px;" abbr="Legs Against"|LA
! style="width:20px;" abbr="Leg Difference"|+/-
! style="width:20px;" abbr="Legs Won Against Throw"|LWAT
! style="width:20px;" abbr="Tons"|100+
! style="width:20px;" abbr="Ton Plus"|140+
! style="width:20px;" abbr="Maximums"|180s
! style="width:20px;" abbr="Average"|A
! style="width:20px;" abbr="High Checkout"|HC
! style="width:20px;" abbr="Checkout Percentage"|C%

|- style="background:#cfc;"
!1
|align=left| || 16 || 11 || 4 || 1 ||26|| 105 || 63 || +42 || 39 ||  ||  || 62 || 107.93 || 170 || 49.30%
|- style="background:#ccffcc;"
!2
|align=left|   RU || 16 || 11 || 2 || 3 ||24|| 100 || 65 || +35 || 36 ||  ||  || 52 || 101.15 || 141 || 46.51%
|- style="background:#ccffcc;"
!3
|align=left|   || 16 || 8 || 4 || 4 ||20|| 92 || 81 || +11 || 30 ||  ||  || 48 || 100.15
|| 144 || 40.35%
|- style="background:#ccffcc;"
!4
|align=left|   || 16 || 9 || 1 || 6 ||19|| 89 || 79 || +10 || 32 ||  ||  || 38 || 96.50 || 144 || 40.09%
|- style="background:#cccffc;"
!5
|align=left|   || 16 || 6 || 5 || 5 ||17|| 86 || 86 || 0 || 27 || ||  || 52 || 99.04 || 161 || 40.00%
|- style="background:#cccffc;"
!6
|align=left|   || 16 || 7 || 2 || 7 ||16|| 82 || 89 || −7 || 27 ||  ||  || 35 || 97.53 || 161 || 42.71%
|- style="background:#cccffc;"
!7
|align=left|  || 16 || 5 || 2 || 9 ||12|| 86 || 94 || −8 || 25 ||  ||  || 44 || 97.88 || 161 || 38.05%
|- style="background:#cccffc;"
!8
|align=left|   || 16 || 2 || 2 || 12 ||6|| 60 || 103 || −43 || 10 ||  ||  || 33 || 92.26 || 145 || 35.93%
|- style="background:#ffcccc;"
!9
|align=left|   || 9 || 1 || 1 || 7 ||3|| 41 || 55 || −14 || 17 ||  ||  || 37 || 98.44 || 116 || 35.96%
|- style="background:#ffcccc;"
!10
|align=left|   || 9 || 1 || 1 || 7 ||3|| 34 || 60 || −26 || 14 ||  ||  || 24 || 91.40 || 122 || 37.36%
|- style="background:#ffcccc;"

Top four qualified for the Play-offs after Week 15.
NB: LWAT = Legs Won Against Throw. 
A = Average
C% = Checkout Percentage
HC = High Checkout.

Positions by round

References

2016
Premier League
Premier League